Aetosauroides (meaning "Aetosaurus-like") is an extinct genus of aetosaur from the Late Triassic of South America. It is one of four aetosaurs known from South America, the others being Neoaetosauroides, Chilenosuchus and Aetobarbakinoides. Three species have been named: the type species A. scagliai, A. subsulcatus and A. inhamandensis. Fossils have been found in the Cancha de Bochas Member of the Ischigualasto Formation in the Ischigualasto-Villa Unión Basin in northwestern Argentina and the Santa Maria Formation in the Paraná Basin in southeastern Brazil. The strata date to the late Carnian and early Norian stages, making Aetosauroides one of the oldest aetosaurs.

Description 
 
Sexual dimorphism has been suggested for Aetosauroides, with males reaching the  size range.

Aetosauroides was proposed to be synonymous with the genus Stagonolepis in 1996 and 2002. Smaller specimens of both species were placed with Stagonolepis robertsoni, and larger specimens were considered to be S. wellesi. This synonymy is not accepted, with several studies identifying unique features that distinguish Aetosauroides from Stagonolepis. Among these are maxillae that do not touch the nostrils, oval-shaped holes on the centra of the vertebrae, and a convex margin of the lower jaw. In a 2011 study, A. subsulcatus and A. inhamandensis were proposed to be synonymous with A. scagliai. Additionally, a contemporary aetosaur named from a juvenile specimen in 2014, Polesinesuchus aurelioi, was found to be similar in its vertebrae and the basioccipital of its braincase to juvenile specimens of Aetosauroides in two 2021 studies, and it was proposed as a junior synonym of the latter.

Classification
A phylogenetic analysis presented by Julia B. Desojo, Martin D. Ezcurra and Edio E. Kischlat in 2012 found that Aetosauroides lies outside Stagonolepididae. If this phylogeny is correct, Stagonolepididae and Aetosauria would not be equivalent groupings, and Aetosauroides would be the first non-stagonolepidid aetosaur.

References 

Aetosaurs
Prehistoric pseudosuchian genera
Carnian genera
Norian genera
Late Triassic reptiles of South America
Triassic Argentina
Fossils of Argentina
Ischigualasto Formation
Triassic Brazil
Fossils of Brazil
Santa Maria Formation
Fossil taxa described in 1960